Macrozamia cranei is a species of plant in the family Zamiaceae. It is endemic to Australia.  Its natural habitat is subtropical or tropical dry forests.

References

cranei
Vulnerable flora of Australia
Nature Conservation Act endangered biota
Vulnerable biota of Queensland
Endangered flora of Australia
Flora of Queensland
Taxonomy articles created by Polbot
Taxa named by Paul Irwin Forster
Taxa named by David L. Jones (botanist)